The 2017 Copa MX Femenil was a women's association football tournament in Mexico. The tournament consists of 12 of the 16 Liga MX Femenil teams. The tournament was held between 3 May and 6 May at the Mexican Football Federation headquarters in Toluca, Mexico. The tournament was used by teams as a test to prepare for the Liga MX Femenil which launched in the second half of 2017.

Pachuca won the final 9–1 against Club Tijuana.

Participants
The tournament was originally scheduled to feature all 16 of the Liga MX Femenil teams. It was later announced by Liga MX CEO Enrique Bonilla that only 12 teams would participate because four teams were not ready. (Atlas, León, Querétaro, Veracruz)

Format
The tournament featured 12 teams divided into 3 groups
The group stage results were reflected in the classification table
The two best teams in the classification table advanced to the final
Each match was 70 minutes long, divided into two halves of 35 minutes with a cooling break at the 25th and 60th minute

Tiebreakers
If two or more clubs were equal on points on completion of the group matches, the following criteria were applied to determine the rankings:
 superior goal difference;
 higher number of goals scored;
 scores of the group matches played among the clubs in question;
 fair play ranking;
 drawing of lots

Group stage

Classification table

Group 1

Group 2

Group 3

Final

Top goalscorers
Players sorted first by goals scored, then by last name

Source: Liga MX Femenil

References

External links
Oficial site

Liga MX Femenil
2016–17 in Mexican football
2017 domestic association football cups
May 2017 sports events in Mexico
2017 in women's association football